Crosscrake is a village in Cumbria, just off the M6 Junction 36 in North West of England. It is located just South of Kendal on the A6, between the villages/hamlets Stainton, Sedgwick and Barrows Green.

About
Crosscrake is a parish in the Kendal ward. Formerly, it was part of Heversham Parish. It is a small, rural village with a school (Crosscrake C of E School) and a church, St. Thomas', Crosscrake.

Church
St. Thomas' Church was built by Paley and Austin in 1875 of square slate blocks. It was built in the style of the 12th century to 13th century. It has a nave, a chancel and transepts. It also has two stained glass windows, with the eastern facing one being made by Clayton and Bell.

References
 http://www.visitcumbria.com/churches/crosscrake.htm

External links

Villages in Cumbria
Stainton, South Lakeland